The FAI Cup 1924–25 was the fourth edition of Ireland's premier cup competition, The Football Association of Ireland Challenge Cup or FAI Cup. The tournament began on 3 January 1925 and concluded on 17 March with the final held at Dalymount Park, Dublin. An official attendance of 23,000 people packed the stadium to capacity as record holders Shamrock Rovers defeated Ringsend rivals Shelbourne to claim their first title.

First round

Second round

Semi-finals

Final

Notes
A.  From 1923 to 1936, the FAI Cup was known as the Free State Cup.

B.  Attendances were calculated using gate receipts which limited their accuracy as a large proportion of people, particularly children, attended football matches in Ireland throughout the 20th century for free by a number of means. However, in this instance of a capacity crowd and the closure of the gates fifteen minutes before kick-off, this practice might not have been as common as usual.

References
General

External links
FAI Website

1924-25
1924–25 in Irish association football
FAI Cup